The 2015–16 Syrian Premier League season is the 45th since its establishment.
This seasons league featured two stages. Stage one pitted two groups of ten teams and kicked off on 22 November 2015. The top three of each group advanced to the Championship Playoff to determine the overall league champions. The bottom two of each group relegated to the second division.
All matches were played in Damascus and Latakia due to security concerns.

First stage

Each team plays each other twice, top three advanced to the championship playoff, bottom two relegate.

Group A

Group B

Championship playoff

Each team plays each other once, the first place teams in the first stage get three points plus, the second place get two points and the third place get one point.

As a result, the teams started with the following points before the playoff: Al-Jaish 3, Al-Wahda 3 points, Al-Karamah 2, Al-Ittihad 2,  Al-Muhafaza 1 and Al-Shorta 1

References

Syrian Premier League seasons
1
Syria